Robert Pratt (December 12, 1845 – August 8, 1908) was an educator and the 18th mayor of Minneapolis. Pratt was born in Brandon, Vermont in 1845. During the American Civil War he served with the 5th Vermont Infantry. Shortly after the war, he relocated to Minneapolis, Minnesota where he served as an alderman, member of the park board, and longtime member of the Board of Education. He was also elected mayor in 1894 and re-elected in 1896. Pratt died on August 8, 1908. He is buried in Lakewood Cemetery in Minneapolis.

Pratt School in the Prospect Park neighborhood of Minneapolis is named after his son, Sidney Pratt, who was killed in the Spanish–American War.

Electoral history
 Minneapolis Mayoral Election, 1894
 Robert Pratt 19,666
 Louis R. Thian 15,343
 Henry J.O. Reed 4,325
 Robert H. Hasty 512
 Minneapolis Mayoral Election, 1896
 Robert Pratt 25,401
 Alexander Thompson Ankeny 16,610
 Milton O. Nelson 821
 Elbert E. Stevens 591

References

1845 births
1908 deaths
Mayors of Minneapolis
People from Brandon, Vermont
People of Vermont in the American Civil War
Burials at Lakewood Cemetery
School board members in Minnesota